Mostafa Shebeita (born on 10 May 1986) is an Egyptian football midfielder currently playing for Wadi Degla.

Career

2009/2010 season 
Shebeita was named in the Al Ahly roster of surprisingly as it was said that he was going to Etisalat. Shebeita scored his first goal for Al Ahly against Wydad Casablanca from a penalty in a pre-season match. Shebeita scored his first League goal for Al Ahly against Ismaily SC. He was chosen for the preliminary African Cup of Nations 2010 squad for Egypt but was left out of the final 23-man squad.

2010/2011 season 
Mostafa scored a goal for Wadi Degla FC in the match against El Gouna FC, it was the second goal in winning 3/1.

References

1986 births
Living people
Egyptian footballers
People from Benha
Association football midfielders
Al Ahly SC players
Wadi Degla SC players
Lierse S.K. players
Belgian Pro League players
Egyptian expatriate footballers
Expatriate footballers in Belgium
Petrojet SC players
Egyptian Premier League players